Dictyophycus is a putative red alga of the middle Cambrian Burgess shale.  While alive, it formed leaf-like lobes about 25mm across.  The fossils do not preserve the leaf-like membrane, so only the sturdier "skeleton" is known; these are usually broken and detached from their holdfast. 308 specimens of Dictyophycus are known from the Greater Phyllopod bed, where they comprise 0.59% of the community.

References

External links
 

Burgess Shale fossils
Cambrian genus extinctions
Cambrian life